Marta Filipa Pen Oliveira Freitas (born 31 July 1993), commonly referred to as Marta Pen, is a Portuguese athlete who competes in middle-distance running events, holding the national record in the mile run, with a time of 4:22.45. At club level, she represents S.L. Benfica.

Freitas won the 2016 U.S. NCAA Championship in the 1500m competing for Mississippi State University in Eugene, Oregon. Moreover, she won a bronze medal in 800 metres at the 2014 Ibero-American Championships. On 10 July 2016, she competed in the final of the 1500 m at the European Athletics Championships, finishing in fifth position with 4:34.41 minutes.

Freitas competed for Portugal at the 2016 Summer Olympics. She placed 36th in Athletics at the 2016 Summer Olympics – Women's 1500 metres in 4:18.53.

References

External links
 
 Profile at Olympic Committee of Portugal 
 Profile of Marta Freitas - 2016 Track & Field Roster - Mississippi State Athletics

1993 births
Living people
Athletes from Lisbon
Athletes (track and field) at the 2016 Summer Olympics
Athletes (track and field) at the 2020 Summer Olympics
Mississippi State Bulldogs women's track and field athletes
Olympic athletes of Portugal
Portuguese female middle-distance runners
Portuguese people of Chinese descent
S.L. Benfica athletes
World Athletics Championships athletes for Portugal